Hoffmannia ecuatoriana is a species of flowering plant in the family Rubiaceae. It is endemic to Ecuador. It is known from just a single collection made in 1944.

References

ecuatoriana
Endemic flora of Ecuador
Endangered plants
Taxonomy articles created by Polbot